The Women's 58 kg event at the 2010 South American Games was held over March 27 at 14:00.

Medalists

Results

New Records

References
Final

58kg W